Chanku Mahato was a freedom fighter of British India hailing from Kudumi Mahato community. Born in Rangamatia village of Godda district in British India. One of leader of Santal rebellion, who mobilized Mahatos to fight against the atrocities of Britishers.

Overview 
Chanku Mahato organised various movement to fight against Britishers along with Santhal leader Sidhu Kanhu brother. The folklore sing by Santhal is like:
... Sidhu Kanu khurkhurir upare, Chand-Vairab lahare lahare; Chanku Mahato, Rama Gope lahare lahare, Challu Jolha lahare lahare.

His slogan was:
... Aapon mati, Aapon dana, Pet kati nihi debo khajna.

He was arrested by Britishers and hanged to death in Godda near Kajhiya river bank on May 15, 1856.

References 

People from Jharkhand
1816 births
1856 deaths
History of Jharkhand